Rancho High School is a zoned, and magnet high school in North Las Vegas, Nevada. It is part of the Clark County School District. Opened in 1953, Rancho High School was the third public high school founded in the Las Vegas Valley, after Las Vegas High School (1905) and Basic High School (1942).

Band
Since 2008, the band program at Rancho High School has gone through a renaissance under the leadership of the band director Clinton Williams, and the principal Dr. James Kuzma. The marching band program "Rancho Regiment" is a three-time Bands of America Regional finalist. In 2018, the Rancho Regiment was the Western Band Association class 3A winner, and the color guard won the high auxiliary award in 2018 & 2019. That same year, the marching band, wind ensemble, and jazz band traveled to Canon City, Colorado and participated in the Canon City Blossom Festival, where they earned the sweepstakes award for its ensemble entries in the competition. In 2019, the brass & woodwind choir along with the clarinet choir were invited to perform in the prestigious Midwest Clinic in Chicago, IL. The band director has earned multiple awards for excellence from The Midwest Clinic and the Nevada Music Educators Association.

Magnet Programs
Rancho High School offers two different Clark County School District magnet programs, The Academy of Aviation (Private Pilot Training and Aerospace Engineering), The Academy of Medicine (Pre-Med, Sports Medicine, Emergency Medical Training), and Biomedical Technology (Biotechnology) Academy.

Academy of Aviation
The Academy of Aviation offers two 4-year programs for students interested in pursuing courses that can lead to college or careers in the aerospace and aviation industry. The Private Pilot Training program offers curriculum in the fundamentals of flight, space travel and rocketry, as well as the opportunity to earn a Private Pilot License.

Academy of Medicine
The Academy of Medicine offers four 4-year college preparatory programs by instructors with extensive professional experience. For students interested in becoming medical doctors or other medical professionals such as veterinarians, nurses, dentists or pharmacists, a Pre-Med program is available.

Academy of Biomedical Technology (Academy of Biotechnology)
Through the Biomedical Technology program, (also referred to as the Biotechnology, "Biotech," Academy,) students are introduced to the unique field of research and the basic skills commonly employed in the biotechnology laboratory. Students participate in DNA extraction, genetic engineering techniques, basic tissue culturing and cloning.

Athletics
Rancho High School offers many different sports, including volleyball, baseball, football, cross-country, swimming, tennis, golf, soccer, wrestling, bowling, track and field, cheerleading and dance, and has many traditions that go along with each individual sport.

Additionally, Rancho is the home to the AFJROTC unit NV-031, the oldest AFJROTC unit in Nevada.

The oldest tradition in Nevada High School football is the Bone Game between Rancho High School Rams and the Las Vegas High School Wildcats

Nevada Interscholastic Activities Association State Championships 
Baseball – 1959, 1960, 1961, 1965, 1969, 1973, 1974, 1976, 2010, 2011, 2014
Football – 1960, 1961, 1962, 1988
Volleyball (Girls) – 1985, 1986
Basketball (Boys) - 1961, 1973, 1977, 1986,1992
Soccer (boys)- 1980,1981,1982,1995, 1998

New facility
The old campus was torn down in June 2006 after over 50 years of being the main location for the school. In July 2006, indoor, mall-style school was completed and the students moved in. It was erected on the site of the old football field. After the campus was completed, construction began on a new artificial turf football field and track. Construction was completed in 2007.

The moving of the school changed its address to the City of Las Vegas, while still being within North Las Vegas.

Notable alumni
 Greg Anthony – former UNLV and NBA basketball player and former CBS Sports analyst
 Marty Barrett, Former MLB player (Boston Red Sox, San Diego Padres)
 Tom Barrett – former MLB infielder (Boston Red Sox, Philadelphia Phillies)
 Alan Burd - Clark County, Nevada's Dusty the Dusthole
Olivia Diaz - Las Vegas City Councilwoman 
 Lionel Hollins – former NBA player and current assistant  coach of the Los Angeles Lakers
 Steve Kazor – former college coach and NFL scout
 Ruben Kihuen – former U.S. Representative
 Joe Lombardo – Governor of Nevada and 17th Sheriff of Clark County
 Mike Maddux – former major league baseball pitcher and current pitching coach for the Texas Rangers
 Ne-Yo – R&B singer
 Mike Pritchard - former NFL wide receiver
 John Welch - Assistant coach for the Los Angeles Clippers
 Larry Beasley - city planner, professor and author ("Vancouverism" 2019 + "Ecodesign for Cities and Suburbs" 2015)

References

External links
 Rancho High School website

Clark County School District
Magnet schools in Nevada
Educational institutions established in 1954
High schools in Clark County, Nevada
Buildings and structures in North Las Vegas, Nevada
School buildings completed in 1954
School buildings completed in 2006
Public high schools in Nevada
1954 establishments in Nevada